Jani Lax (born October 26, 1977) is a Swedish professional mixed martial artist and occasional kickboxer, who competes in the Lightweight division. He has fought around the world in a number of promotions including Finnfight, K-1, M-1 Global and Shooto.

Career
Lax began his mixed martial arts career in 1999 with Finnfight, one of the largest promotions in the Nordic countries and known for its brutal no-holds-barred rules. He lost his debut against Marcus Peltonen by knockout in the first round, but went on to defeat Joachim Hansen in his next bout.

After Finnfight, he fought in M-1 Global in Russia, where he had one win and one loss. He then went to Japan to fight with Shooto, where his promotional debut came against Akira Kikuchi. Kikuchi was able to submit him in the first round. After this loss, he had a four-fight winning streak spanning across Europe and Japan. It was halted, however, when he came up against Tatsuya Kawajiri in April 2005. He also lost his next two bouts, against Hiroyuki Takaya and Alexandre Izidro.

In May 2010, he returned to the ring for the first time in almost three years and submitted Danny van Bergen at an M-1 Global event in Helsinki. His next bout was scheduled to be in the British Association of Mixed Martial Arts promotion against Rob Sinclair for the BAMMA Lightweight Championship at BAMMA 4: Reid vs. Watson on September 25, 2010. However, just three days before the fight, Lax withdrew with an injury.

Mixed martial arts record

|-
| Win
| align=center| 10–8
| Bobby McVittie
| KO (punches)
| Vision FC - Fight Night 1
| 
| align=center| 1
| align=center| 0:59
| Karlstad, Sweden
| 
|-
| Loss
| align=center| 9–8
| Kenichiro Togashi
| TKO (doctor stoppage)
| Shooto: The Way of Shooto 4: Like a Tiger, Like a Dragon
| 
| align=center| 3
| align=center| 1:30
| Tokyo, Japan
| 
|-
| Win
| align=center| 9–7
| Danny van Bergen
| Submission (armbar)
| M-1 Selection 2010: Western Europe Round 3
| 
| align=center| 1
| align=center| 2:40
| Helsinki, Finland
| 
|-
| Loss
| align=center| 8–7
| Takashi Nakakura
| Submission (achilles lock)
| Shooto: Back To Our Roots 4
| 
| align=center| 1
| align=center| 2:54
| Tokyo, Japan
| 
|-
| Win
| align=center| 8–6
| John Mahlow
| Decision (split)
| Ironheart Crown 11: Apocalypse
| 
| align=center| 3
| align=center| 5:00
| Hammond, Indiana, United States
| 
|-
| Loss
| align=center| 7–6
| Alexandre Izidro
| Submission (guillotine choke)
| CWFC: Strike Force 3
| 
| align=center| 1
| align=center| 2:58
| Coventry, England
| 
|-
| Loss
| align=center| 7–5
| Hiroyuki Takaya
| TKO (punch)
| K-1 Hero's 2
| 
| align=center| 1
| align=center| 1:56
| Tokyo, Japan
| 
|-
| Loss
| align=center| 7–4
| Tatsuya Kawajiri
| TKO (punches)
| Shooto: 4/23 in Hakata Star Lanes
| 
| align=center| 1
| align=center| 4:42
| Hakata, Japan
| 
|-
| Win
| align=center| 7–3
| Metin Yakut
| Submission (armbar)
| G-Shooto: G-Shooto 02
| 
| align=center| 1
| align=center| 3:28
| Stockholm, Sweden
| 
|-
| Win
| align=center| 6–3
| Kohei Yasumi
| Submission (guillotine choke)
| Shooto: Wanna Shooto 2004
| 
| align=center| 2
| align=center| 3:25
| Tokyo, Japan
| 
|-
| Win
| align=center| 5–3
| Oliver Ellis
| Submission (rear-naked choke)
| Shooto Sweden: Initial Collision
| 
| align=center| 1
| align=center| 2:24
| Stockholm, Sweden
| 
|-
| Win
| align=center| 4–3
| Mikael Lähdesmäki
| Decision (unanimous)
| Shooto Finland: Capital Punishment 2
| 
| align=center| 2
| align=center| 5:00
| Helsinki, Finland
| 
|-
| Loss
| align=center| 3–3
| Akira Kikuchi
| Submission (kimura)
| Shooto - Wanna Shooto 2002
| 
| align=center| 1
| align=center| 2:51
| Tokyo, Japan
| 
|-
| Win
| align=center| 3–2
| Musail Allaudinov
| Submission (rear-naked choke)
| M-1 MFC - European Championship 2002
| 
| align=center| 1
| align=center| 0:44
| St. Petersburg, Russia
| 
|-
| Loss
| align=center| 2–2
| Sergei Bytchkov
| TKO (punches)
| M-1 MFC - Russia vs. the World 2
| 
| align=center| 1
| align=center| 3:00
| St. Petersburg, Russia
| 
|-
| Win
| align=center| 2–1
| Toni Stenman
| KO
| Finnfight 4
| 
| align=center| 1
| align=center| 5:37
| Turku, Finland
| 
|-
| Win
| align=center| 1–1
| Joachim Hansen
| Submission (rear-naked choke)
| Finnfight 4
| 
| align=center| 1
| align=center| 9:25
| Turku, Finland
| 
|-
| Loss
| align=center| 0–1
| Marcus Peltonen
| KO (headkick)
| Finnfight 3
| 
| align=center| 1
| align=center| 0:58
| Turku, Finland
|

Kickboxing record

Legend:

References

External links

1977 births
Living people
Swedish male mixed martial artists
Lightweight mixed martial artists
Mixed martial artists utilizing shootboxing
Swedish male kickboxers
Middleweight kickboxers
People from Gävle
Sportspeople from Gävleborg County